Açıkalan is a village in the Mutki District of Bitlis Province in Turkey. Its population is 302 (2021).

References

Villages in Mutki District